Ghost Light Projects was a registered non profit theatre society founded in 2009 by Randie Parliament and T.J. Tasker in Toronto, Ontario, Canada. In the autumn of 2012, the company relocated and incorporated in Vancouver, British Columbia, Canada. The company closed in April 2015

The company was an artist based and focused on LGBT positive themed work.

History
Initially created as a platform to bring Hedwig and the Angry Inch and Debbie Does Dallas: The Musical together as a double bill, the company hit a stride with its run of Off Broadway and independent hits.

Artistic team

 Randie Parliament - Artistic Producer (2009-2015)
 Greg Bishop - Associate Producer (2012-2015)
 Brenda Matthews - Associate Producer (2009-2013)
 T.J. Tasker (2009)

Production history

2014/15 season

 "Hedwig and the Angry Inch" by John Cameron Mitchell and Stephen Trask
 "Corpus Christi (play)" by Terrence McNally
 "Exit The King" by Eugene Ionesco, translated by Geoffrey Rush and Neil Armfield
 "The Singing Butler" by Randie Parliament

2013/14 season

 The Children's Hour by Lillian Hellman
 Hedwig and the Angry Inch by John Cameron Mitchell and Stephen Trask
 The Boys in the Band by Mart Crowley
 Let's Kill Grandma This Christmas by Brian Gianci
 Clue: The Musical
 Gross Indecency: The Three Trials of Oscar Wilde by Moisés Kaufman

2012/13 season

 Baby With the Bathwater by Christopher Durang
 Mother May I by Randie Parliament
 Love! Valour! Compassion! by Terrence McNally

2011/12 season

 Mother May I by Randie Parliament
 The Boys in the Band by Mart Crowley
 The Great American Trailer Park Musical by David Nehls and Betsy Kelso

2010/11 season

 The Vagina Monologues by Eve Ensler
 The Boys in the Band by Mart Crowley
 The Santaland Diaries by David Sedaris
 The Book of Liz by Amy Sedaris and David Sedaris

2009/10 season

 Hedwig and the Angry Inch by John Cameron Mitchell and Stephen Trask
 Debbie Does Dallas: The Musical by Susan L. Schwartz
 Mamma's Boy by Randie Parliament
 Larger Than Life: The Musical by SG Lee

Awards
Jessie Richardson Theatre Award 
 Outstanding Actor - Ryan Alexander McDonald Hedwig And The Angry Inch (play) - Nominated

Ovation Awards
 Outstanding Ensemble Production - Hedwig And The Angry Inch - Nominated
 Outstanding Lead Actor - Ryan Alexander McDonald - Hedwig And The Angry Inch - Nominated

Community Theatre Coalition
 Outstanding Production - The Boys In The Band -  Winner! 
 Outstanding Musical Production - Hedwig And The Angry Inch (play) - Nominated
 Outstanding Musical Production - Clue The Musical - Nominated
 Outstanding Direction of a Play - Randie Parliament & Greg Bishop - The Boys In The Band -  Winner! 
 Outstanding Direction of a Musical - Randie Parliament - Clue The Musical - Nominated
 Outstanding Direction of a Musical - Randie Parliament - Hedwig And The Angry Inch - Nominated
 Outstanding Lead Actor in a Musical - Ryan Alexander McDonald - Hedwig And The Angry Inch -  Winner! 
 Outstanding Lead Actor in a Play - Greg Bishop - Gross Indecency: The Three Trials of Oscar Wilde -  Winner! 
 Outstanding Lead Actor in a Play - James Dolby - Corpus Christi - Nominated
 Outstanding Supporting Actor in a Musical - Greg Armstrong Morris - Clue The Musical - Nominated
 Outstanding Supporting Actress in a Musical - Stephanie Liatopoulos - Clue The Musical -  Winner! 
 Outstanding Supporting Actress in a Musical - Meggie McKinnon - Clue The Musical - Nominated
 Outstanding Supporting Actor in a Play - Marco Arimare - The Boys In The Band - Nominated
 Outstanding Supporting Actor in a Play - Mitchell Mackay - Gross Indecency: The Three Trials of Oscar Wilde - Nominated
 Outstanding Supporting Actress in a Play - Kieylla Thornton-Trump - The Singing Butler - Nominated
 Outstanding Choreography - Marco Arimare - Clue The Musical - Nominated
 Outstanding Lighting Design - Darren Boquist - Clue The Musical -  Winner! 
 Outstanding Lighting Design - Darren Boquist - Corpus Christi - Nominated
 Outstanding Sound Design - Hedwig and The Angry Inch - Nominated
 Outstanding Sound Design - James Coomber - Corpus Christi - '" Winner! "'
 Outstanding Costume Design - Randie Parliament & Brenda Matthews - Hedwig And The Angry Inch - Nominated
 Outstanding Costume Design - Randie Parliament - Clue The Musical - Nominated
 Outstanding Poster Design - Randie Parliament - Corpus Christi - Nominated
 Outstanding Poster Design - Randie Parliament - Exit The King - Nominated

Community
Ghost Light Projects sponsors an Out For Kicks soccer team in Vancouver, BC, Canada.

References

Theatre companies in Toronto
Theatre companies in British Columbia
LGBT theatre in Canada